The Men's 50 metre free pistol Team event at the 2013 Southeast Asian Games took place on 13 December 2013 at the North Dagon Shooting Range in Yangon, Myanmar.

There were five teams of three shooters competed, the results of the team competition also served as qualification for individual competition, the top eight shooters qualified to individual final

Each shooter fired 60 shots with a pistol at 50 metres distance. Scores for each shot were in increments of 1, with a maximum score of 10, all scores from three shooters per team combine to determine team scores.

Schedule
All times are Myanmar Standard Time (UTC+06:30)

Results

References

Shooting at the 2013 Southeast Asian Games